Pulß is a German surname, derived from the Slavic forename Boleš, a short form of Bolesław, meaning "great glory."

Notable people with the surname include:

Irmgard Neumann, née Pulß, East German politician
 Henning Pulß, writer and director

See also
 Puls (surname)

References

German-language surnames